Escapães is a Portuguese parish, located in the municipality of Santa Maria da Feira. The population in 2011 was 3,309, in an area of 4.30 km2.

References

Freguesias of Santa Maria da Feira